Stroud & Swindon Building Society was the 10th largest building society in the United Kingdom, with headquarters in Stroud, Gloucestershire and total assets of £2.7 billion as at 31 December 2009. It was a member of the Building Societies Association until its merger with the Coventry Building Society in 2010.

Stroud & Swindon Building Society operated through a branch network of 22 offices and 22 agencies in Gloucestershire, Wiltshire, Somerset, Monmouthshire, Devon and Cornwall complemented by a contact centre based in Gloucester. Stroud & Swindon was a provider of both mortgages and savings, as well as offering loans, credit cards and insurance.

History 

Stroud and Swindon Building Society was originally established in 1850 as the Stroud Provident Benefit Building Society. The first head office was in Rowcroft in Stroud where the offices of Winterbothams solicitors are now and, indeed, Lyndsey Winterbotham was the first Chairman.

Over the years a series of acquisitions of other societies including the Bristol Permanent Building Society and the Frome and Selwood Building Society saw the Stroud Building Society develop and grow. Merger with the Swindon Permanent Building Society in 1986 led to the change of title of Stroud & Swindon.

Community Support 
Stroud & Swindon supported non-profit events and voluntary groups located within its region. Donations or assistance tended to be on a one-off basis and in order to make its support as effective as possible it focused on projects in areas where it had branches and could make the most impact.

The Society had 22 branches based in Gloucestershire, Wiltshire, Somerset and Monmouthshire and each branch nominated their own local charity to support for the year. It also supported a number of other local charities which met its overall criteria as well as some major national events such as BBC Children in Need and Comic Relief.

Stroud & Swindon also developed affinity savings accounts with Bath RFC, Forest Green Rovers F.C., The Willow Trust and The Cotswold Care Hospice.

Merger with the Coventry Building Society

The Stroud & Swindon merged with the Coventry Building Society on 1 September 2010 following an announcement on 23 March and the approval of members on 16 June.  The Stroud and Swindon name continued for a year as a separate and distinct brand.  However, the head office functions transferred to Coventry immediately. The former Stroud & Swindon Building Society is now fully integrated with the Coventry.

References

External links

Stroud & Swindon Building Society
Building Societies Association
KPMG Building Societies Database 2009

Banks established in 1850
Organizations established in 1850
Companies based in Stroud, Gloucestershire
1850 establishments in England